XDB may refer to:

Software 
xBase (xDB) - a family of database management systems and related programming languages
Xbase (formerly known as XDB) - a software library from the xBase family
XDB Enterprise Server - a historical product from the xBase family
Oracle XML DB - an Oracle Database feature
EMC Documentum xDB - a native XML database

Other 
Gare de Lille Europe (XDB IATA code) - a railway station and an international airport in Lille, France.